Painted On is a 2005 studio album by Texas based blues rock band The Fabulous Thunderbirds. It was produced by Steve Berlin of Los Lobos and features Rachel Nagy of The Detroit Cobras.

Track listing
 "Hard Knock"
 "Got to Get Out"
 "Two-Time Fool"
 "Love Speaks Louder Than Words"
 "Painted On"
 "Feeling My Way Around"
 "Rock Candy"
 "Only Daddy That'll Walk the Line"
 "Postman"
 "Wild Cherry"
 "You Torture Me"
 "When I am Gone"

References

External links
Official Site

2005 albums
The Fabulous Thunderbirds albums
Rykodisc albums
Artemis Records albums